Frederick I, the Hunsrücker (German: Friedrich I.; 19 November 1417 – 29 November 1480) was the Count Palatine of Simmern from 1459 until 1480.

Frederick was born in 1417 to Stephen, Count Palatine of Simmern-Zweibrücken and his wife, Anna of Veldenz. In 1444 his father partitioned his territories between Frederick and his younger brother Louis. Frederick married Margaret of Guelders, daughter of Duke Arnold, on 16 August 1454. Frederick died in Simmern in 1480 and was buried in the Augustinian Abbey of Ravengiersburg.

Children
With Margaret (1436 – 15 August 1486), daughter of Arnold, Duke of Guelders:
Katherine of Palatinate-Simmern (1455 – 28 December 1522), Abbess in the St Klara monastery in Trier
Stephen (25 February 1457 – 1488/9) Canon in Strasbourg , Mainz and Cologne
William (2 January 1458 – 1458)
John I (15 May 1459 – 27 January 1509)
Frederick (10 April 1460 – 22 November 1518) Canon in Cologne, Speyer , Trier , Mainz, Magdeburg and Strasbourg
Rupert (16 October 1461 – 19 April 1507), bishop of Regensburg.
Anne (30 July 1465 – 15 July 1517)  Nun in Trier
Margaret (2 December 1466 – August 1506) Nun in Trier
Helene (1467 – 21 February 1555) Prioress in the St. Agnes monastery in Trier
William (20 April 1468 – 1481) Canon in Trier

House of Wittelsbach
Counts Palatine of the Holy Roman Empire
1417 births
1480 deaths
15th-century German people